Komi Dzje (Ԇ ԇ; italics: Ԇ ԇ) is a letter of the Molodtsov alphabet, a variant of Cyrillic. It was used in the writing of the Komi language in the 1920s. It is derived from the Cyrillic letter З.

Computing codes

See also 
Cyrillic characters in Unicode

Cyrillic letters
Komi language
Languages of Russia
Permic languages